The year 1880 in birding and ornithology.

Birds described in 1880  include  Rufous-fronted parakeet, Racket-tailed roller,  Buff-bellied mannikin, Orange-crested manakin, Pale-billed sicklebill, Waigeo brushturkey,  Ashambu laughingthrush, Eastern violet-backed sunbird, Black bishop,

Events
Death of Étienne Mulsant
William Brewster appointed assistant in charge of the collection of birds and mammals in the Boston Society of Natural History

Publications
Osbert Salvin and Frederick DuCane Godman, 1880 On the birds of the Sierra Nevada of Santa Marta, Colombia The Ibis ( 4 ). Band 4, 1880, S. 169–178
Philip Sclater and  Osbert Salvin 1880  On the Birds collected by Mr. C. Buckley in Eastern Equador. Proceedings of the Zoological Society of London Pt.2: 155–160.
Othniel Charles Marsh Odontornithes: a monograph on the extinct toothed birds of North America; with thirty-four plates and forty woodcuts, Washington :Govt. print. off.,1880.
Charles B. Cory Birds of the Bahama islands; containing many birds new to the islands, and a number of undescribed winter plumages of North American species (Boston, 1880).
Ongoing events
John Gould The birds of Asia 1850-83 7 vols. 530 plates, Artists: J. Gould, H. C. Richter, W. Hart and J. Wolf; Lithographers:H. C. Richter and W. Hart
Henry Eeles Dresser and Richard Bowdler Sharpe  A History of the Birds of Europe, Including all the Species Inhabiting the Western Palearctic Region.Taylor & Francis of Fleet Street, London
José Vicente Barbosa du Bocage Ornithologie d'Angola. 2 volumes, 1877–1881.
Osbert Salvin and Frederick DuCane Godman 1879–1904. Biologia Centrali-Americana . Aves
Richard Bowdler Sharpe Catalogue of the Birds in the British Museum London,1874-98.
 Gustav Hartlaub , Jean Cabanis, Otto Finsch and other members of the German Ornithologists' Society in Journal für Ornithologie online BHL
The Ibis

References

Bird
Birding and ornithology by year